Daniel Hooper may refer to:

 Dan Hooper (born 1976), American cosmologist and particle physicist
 Swampy (Daniel Hooper, born 1973), environmental activist
 Daniel Hooper (New Jersey judge) (died 1701), judge and politician in New Jersey